Lorenzo Ghiglieri (November 25, 1931 – January 25, 2020) was an American painter and sculptor. The Portland, Oregon, newspaper Willamette Week referred to Ghiglieri as "one of the Northwest's best-recognized and most prolific bronze sculptors."

Ghiglieri's sculptures are displayed in a wide variety of locations around the world. His -high sculpture of an eagle is located at the entrance of the Seven Feathers Casino near Canyonville, Oregon. Ghiglieri also has works on permanent display at the White House,  the Vatican, and Middlebury College. In 2009, he was awarded a commission by the Brown Bear Car Wash chain to design its parking lot art.

References

External links
Official site

1931 births
2020 deaths
United States Navy personnel of the Korean War
American people of French descent
American people of Italian descent
Artists from Los Angeles
Sculptors from Oregon